Don Howell (15 July 1935 – 5 December 2019) was an Australian rules footballer who played with St Kilda and Collingwood in the Victorian Football League (VFL).

Notes

External links 

1935 births
2019 deaths
Australian rules footballers from Victoria (Australia)
St Kilda Football Club players
Collingwood Football Club players
Portland Football Club players